Gérard Pélisson (9 February 1932 – 6 March 2023) was a French hotelier and businessman who was the co-founder of the Accor Group, and president of the Institut Paul Bocuse.

Biography
Pelisson obtained his engineering diploma from the École Centrale Paris in 1955 and was a graduate of MIT in Boston.

In September 2008, he wrote, together with Paul Dubrule, the history of the adventure of Accor Group published in the Harmony of the Accor Group by Transversales Éditions.  As one of the supporters of Charles Millon, he was a patron of the International School of Business and Development 3A in 1993.

Pelisson was president of the Union des Français de l'Etranger from 1997–2023.

On 27 January 2011, he delivered a press conference concerning the reasons why the Accor Group left Tunisia 3 years prior: "In Tunisia, we were forced, for example, to buy for 7 million euros a run-down hotel that was completely worthless, in order to allow the bank to list that sum as an asset. This is no longer possible".

On 6 March 2023, Pelisson died at the age of 91. Business executive and President of TF1 Gilles Pélisson is his nephew.

Bibliography
Le Bonheur d'entreprendre, de Novotel à Accor (Undertaken Happiness): a great human adventure, Jean-Philippe Bozek, 2010 ed. (history of Gérard Pélisson and Accor Group written in the form of a fictionalized biography).

References

1932 births
2023 deaths
Businesspeople from Lyon
École Centrale Paris alumni
Massachusetts Institute of Technology alumni
Grand Officiers of the Légion d'honneur
Officers of the Ordre national du Mérite
French company founders